Iris polystictica is a species of praying mantis found in Central Asia, Caucasus, southeastern Ukraine, southern Siberia, China, and Mongolia. It is the only species of the mantis genus Iris that is found in Russia.

Description
About 28-49mm in length.

Subspecies
Iris polystictica polystictica (Fischer-Waldheim, 1846) Afghanistan, China, Iran, Tadschikistan, Transcaucasus, Turkmenistan, Turkestan
Iris polystictica mongolica (Sjostedt, 1932) Mongolia, China
Iris polystictica shahdarinica (Lindt, 1963) Tadschikistan
Iris polystictica shugnanica (Lindt, 1963) Tadschikistan

See also
List of mantis genera and species
Iris oratoria

References

External links
 Picture showing deimatic behavior of adult males of Iris polystictica.

Tarachodidae
Mantodea of Asia
Insects described in 1846